Daniel Sylwander (born September 23, 1992) is a Swedish professional ice hockey player. He is currently playing with Tingsryds AIF of the Swedish HockeyAllsvenskan (Allsv).

Daniel Sylwander made his SHL debut playing with Rögle BK during the 2012–13 Elitserien season.

References

External links

1992 births
Living people
Modo Hockey players
Swedish ice hockey centres
Rögle BK players
People from Ängelholm Municipality
Tingsryds AIF players